Imrich Matyáš (24 April 1896, Bratislava – 18 October 1974, Bratislava) was one of the earliest activist in Czechoslovakia to fight for the equal rights of sexual minorities and the decriminalization of homosexuality. He was a contributor to the first Czechoslovak queer periodical, Hlas sexuální menšiny ("Voice of the Sexual Minorites”).

Early life 

Imrich was born in Bratislava (then part of the Kingdom of Hungary and the Austro-Hungarian Empire) to a family with aristocratic roots. After serving as soldier in the Italian front of World War I, he began a lifelong career as a clerk at the Social Security and Retirement
Benefits Institute. He started advocating for the rights of homosexuals from 1919.

Activism 

Imrich's work as an advocate for homosexuality has been influenced by the writings of German sexologist Magnus Hirschfeld and activist Kurt Hiller. Along with them, he was a member of the Scientific-Humanitarian Committee and the World League for Sexual Reform. To aid Bratislava's queer community, he authored a manual for gay people abound how to defend themselves in the criminal justice system. 

After World War II, the new Czechoslovak government continued the criminalisation of homosexual acts and the new Penal Code of 1950 made it punishable to up to one year of imprisonment. Imrich actively argued against the legislation and tried to convince officials about amending it. Homosexuality was finally decriminalised in Czechoslovakia in 29 November 1961.

See also 
 LGBT history in the Czech Republic

References

External links
 First Slovak LGBTI activist has fought for 40 years, The Slovak Spectator
 Imrich Matyáš - early activist who documented an entire era, chapter in the online exhibition Loading: Love
 Online exhibition about Imrich Matyáš 

1896 births
1974 deaths
19th-century LGBT people
Slovak LGBT rights activists
20th-century LGBT people